Chukka Ramaiah (born 20 November 1925) is an Indian educationist and member of the Telangana Legislative Council. He is famously known as "IIT Ramaiah" for teaching at IIT Study Circle, an IIT JEE coaching centre at Nallakunta, Hyderabad. He was a leading Telangana activist.

Career
Ramaiah fought against the feudal system in Hyderabad State that was prevalent in rural hinterland of Telangana region. He actively participated in helping the poor, and was banished by his Brahmin community for helping the dalits and the downtrodden. He joined the Mahatma Gandhi's untouchability movement and tried to reform backward sections in his village. He actively participated in the rebellion against the Razakar Movement and was jailed for several years.

Political career
Ramaiah was elected to the Telangana Legislative Council from Teacher's Constituency of Warangal, Khammam and Nalgonda  in 2007 and held the position for 6 years. He was floor leader of 8 independent MLCs who got elected from different Constituencies.

Activism
He was instrumental in the fight to set up an IIT in Telangana at Hyderabad, Telangana. However, the government set it up near Hyderabad, in spite of his opposition.

He was a strong votary for the statehood of Telangana and often spoke of poverty and backwardness of the region.

Writing career
Ramaiah authored over 16 books in Telugu, mainly focusing on education, including Chinna Paatam and Desadesallo Vidya.

References

External links
 Chukka Ramaiah Biography Part 1
 Chukka Ramaiah Biography Part 2
 Books authored by Chukka Ramaiah
 Student reviews of IIT Study Circle

Educators from Andhra Pradesh
Telangana Rebellion
People from Hanamkonda district
1925 births
Living people
Members of the Andhra Pradesh Legislative Council
Telugu politicians
20th-century Indian educational theorists